"Beep Beep I'm a Sheep" is a novelty song released in 2017 and featured in asdfmovie10 and the Ubisoft dance rhythm game Just Dance 2018. The original idea was conceived by English YouTuber TomSka in 2014, and subsequently included it as a short segment in his asdfmovie series. He worked with musician LilDeuceDeuce to create a full-length version and then released it as an independent song on April Fools' Day 2017; it became a viral hit. It features Tom and Gabriel Brown (more commonly known as Black Gryph0n) on vocals.

References

2017 YouTube videos
2017 songs
Comedy songs
Novelty songs
Electronic songs
Songs about sheep
Internet memes introduced in 2017
Viral videos